Basut-e Bala (also Romanized as Basūt-e Bālā and Besūt-e Bālā; also known as Basot, Bāst, Basūt, and Besūt) is a village in Bahu Kalat Rural District, Dashtiari District, Chabahar County, Sistan and Baluchestan Province, Iran. At the 2006 census, its population was 226, in 43 families.

References 

Populated places in Chabahar County